Evil: In the Time of Heroes is a 2009 Greek zombie horror film starring Billy Zane.

Plot
The story plays three days later as the first movie, the ancient power transmuted the people in bloody-minded zombies, for over 9000 years the fight was ever between undead and humans, who won by the humans.

Cast 
 Billy Zane as Prophitis Messenger
 Andreas Kontopoulos as Vakirtzis
 Argyris Thanasoulas as Argyris
 Meletis Georgiadis as Meletis
 Pepi Moschovskou as Marina
 Mary Tsoni as Jenny
 Eftixia Giakoumi as Olga
 Ioanna Pappa as  Vicky
 Apostolis Totsikas as Androkles
 Orfeas Avgoustidis as Alkiviades
 Drosos Skotis as Mageiras
 Thanos Tokakis as Johnny
 Christos Biros as Kyr-Kostas

Release
The film premiered on 25 September 2009 as part of the Athens Film Festival and was released in the Greek cinemas on 1 October 2009. The film is part of the Fantasia Festival 2010 under the International title Evil – In the Time of Heroes.

Background 
The film is the follow-up as prequel to Evil

References

External links
 

2009 films
2000s Greek-language films
2009 comedy horror films
2000s disaster films
Greek zombie films
Films set in Greece
Greek horror films
2000s survival films
Zombie comedy films
2009 comedy films